The Hypocreaceae are a family within the class Sordariomycetes. Species of Hypocreaceae are usually recognized by their brightly colored, perithecial ascomata, typically yellow, orange or red. The family was proposed by Giuseppe De Notaris in 1844. According to the Dictionary of the Fungi (10th edition, 2008), the family has 22 genera and 454 species. In 2020, it was re-analysed and determined to have only 17 genera and about 658 species.

Genera
As accepted in 2020;

Arachnocrea  (3)

Dialhypocrea  (1)
Escovopsioides  (1)
Escovopsis  (14)

Hypocreopsis  (14)
Hypomyces  (ca. 150)
Kiflimonium  (1)
Lichenobarya  (1)
Mycogone  (28)

Protocrea  (6)
Rogersonia  (1)

Sepedonium  (13)
Sphaerostilbella  (13)
Sporophagomyces  (3)
Stephanoma  (?6)
Trichoderma  (400+)
Verticimonosporium  (3)

References

 
Ascomycota families
Taxa named by Giuseppe De Notaris
Taxa described in 1844